{{Infraspeciesbox
|name = Mountain correa
|image = Correa lawrenceana var. glandulifera.jpg
|image_caption = Cultivated specimen in the ANBG
|genus = Correa
|species = lawrenceana
|varietas = glandulifera
|authority = Paul G.Wilson<ref name="APC">{{cite web |title=Correa lawrenceana var. glandulifera |url=https://biodiversity.org.au/nsl/services/apc-format/display/80654|publisher=Australian Plant Census |accessdate= 12 July 2020}}</ref>
|synonyms_ref =  
|synonyms = * Correa lawrenciana var. glandulifera Paul G.Wilson orth.var.
}}Correa lawrenceana var. glandulifera, commonly known as the mountain correa, is a variety of Correa lawrenceana and is endemic to eastern Australia. It is a shrub or small tree with egg-shaped leaves and greenish yellow flowers arranged singly or in groups of up to five with woolly hairs on the outside.

Flowering mainly occurs in spring.

Taxonomy

Distribution and habitat
This variety of C. lawrenceana'' grows on the margins of rainforest, in mountains from the Gibraltar Range in New South Wales to the McPherson Range in far south-eastern Queensland.

References

lawrenciana glandulifera
Flora of Queensland
Flora of New South Wales
Taxa named by Paul G. Wilson
Plants described in 1961